Eratoena sulcifera is a species of small sea snail, a marine gastropod mollusk in the family Eratoidae, the false cowries or trivias.

Description
The shell size varies between 3 mm and 5 mm

Distribution
This marine species occurs in the Indo-West Pacific, in French Polynesia and off the Aldabra Atoll.

References

 Liltved W.R. (2000) Cowries and their relatives of southern Africa. A study of the southern African cypraeacean and velutinacean gastropod fauna. Seacomber Publications. 224 pp. page(s): 191
 Fehse D. (2010) Contributions to the knowledge of the Eratoidae IV. A new species from Tuamotu, French Polynesia. Spixiana, 33(1):13-18.

External links
 

Triviidae
Gastropods described in 1832
Taxa named by John Edward Gray